The Duke of Burgundy is a 2014 British erotic romance drama film written and directed by Peter Strickland, and starring Sidse Babett Knudsen as Cynthia and Chiara D'Anna as Evelyn.

The film was screened at various film festivals, including the Toronto International Film Festival, the London Film Festival, and the International Film Festival Rotterdam, to positive critical reviews. This was Monica Swinn's first film role in over 30 years (she had previously retired in 1982).

Plot
Evelyn is studying lepidopterology under the older Cynthia, who frequently lectures on her studies. Evelyn is romantically involved with Cynthia and works as a maid in her home, where she is subject to strict behavioural expectations and high standards of cleanliness. When Evelyn does not complete tasks to Cynthia's satisfaction, she is punished.

As Cynthia increasingly falters in her dominance, it becomes apparent that Evelyn is orchestrating Cynthia's role in the relationship by writing instructions and scripts for specific scenes, which the couple acts out in the same way each day. While Evelyn finds the scenes to be sexually exciting, Cynthia only acts them out to sate her lover. She attempts to please Evelyn by ordering a carpenter to construct a bed with a drawer underneath for Evelyn to sleep in as a punishment; however, Evelyn is unhappy with the length of time it will take to produce the bed, and ultimately refuses the gift.

Evelyn begins to demand that Cynthia lock her in a trunk in the evening as a new punishment. Cynthia agrees, but she is resentful about the new physical separation. Cynthia also becomes self-conscious about her ageing, having injured her back moving the trunk to her bedside. She expresses her unhappiness on Evelyn's birthday, when she demands that Evelyn bake her own birthday cake, which Cynthia eats while reclining with her feet resting on Evelyn's face. Evelyn does not enjoy the scene and calls out her safeword, pinastri, which Cynthia ignores.

The couple's relationship becomes more strained as Evelyn's expectations go unfulfilled. Finally, Cynthia accuses Evelyn of polishing another lecturer's boots, which she considers to be an act of betrayal. The two eventually seem to make up, and Evelyn agrees to put less emphasis on her sexual needs. The film ends with the couple going through the same play routine seen at the film's start.

Cast
 Sidse Babett Knudsen as Cynthia  
 Chiara D'Anna as Evelyn 
 Monica Swinn as Lorna 
 Eugenia Caruso as Dr. Fraxini 
 Fatma Mohamed as The Carpenter  
 Kata Bartsch as Dr. Lurida   
 Eszter Tompa as Dr. Viridana 
 Zita Kraszkó as Dr. Schuller

Title
As lepidopterology (the study of moths and butterflies) is a theme throughout the film, the title refers to the Duke of Burgundy (Hamearis lucina) butterfly, although it is no longer known "how [it] received that name in the first place, any reasoning being lost in the mists of entomological antiquity."

Reception
The film received overwhelmingly positive reviews from critics. Review aggregator website Rotten Tomatoes reported an approval rating of 94%, based on 101 reviews, with an average rating of 8 out of 10. The critical consensus reads "Stylish, sensual, and smart, The Duke of Burgundy proves that erotic cinema can have genuine substance". At Metacritic, which assigns a weighted average score, the film has a score of 87 out of 100, indicating "Universal Acclaim" based on 24 reviews.

The A.V. Club called The Duke of Burgundy the 4th best film of 2015 and the 34th best film of the 2010s. The Indiewire critic's poll named it the third best film of the year, and it ranked 69th in that publication's list of the best films of the decade.

The film's score by Cat's Eyes also received positive attention.

Awards and accolades
Strickland received The Wouter Barendrecht Pioneering Vision Award at the Hamptons International Film Festival for his work in the film. The film also won the Grand Jury Prize at the 23rd Philadelphia Film Festival.

Soundtrack
The Duke of Burgundy was released by Cat's Eyes in February 2015.

References

External links 
 
 

2014 films
2014 LGBT-related films
2014 romantic drama films
British romantic drama films
British LGBT-related films
2010s English-language films
Films directed by Peter Strickland
Films shot in Hungary
Lesbian-related films
LGBT-related romantic drama films
BDSM in films
Films featuring an all-female cast
2010s British films